Patrick Makau Musyoki (born 2 March 1985) is a runner from Kenya. He is a former world record holder in the marathon—His time of 2:03:38, run at the 2011 Berlin Marathon, was the world record for two years, until it was beaten by Wilson Kipsang Kiprotich at the 2013 Berlin Marathon. He is also notable for his half marathon performances, having won a number of prominent competitions in Europe in sub-1-hour performances.

Career
Makau attended Unyuani School until 1999, after which he joined Kyeni Academy, Misiani. He started running in 2001. He competed at the 2006 IAAF World Road Running Championships and finished in 26th place.

He finished second at the 2007 Ras Al Khaimah Half Marathon by running 59:13 minutes, being beaten only by Samuel Wanjiru who set the world record (58:53) at the same race. He won silver at the 2007 IAAF World Road Running Championships and 2008 IAAF World Half Marathon Championships. He was also part of the Kenyan team that won the team race both times.

He won at the City-Pier-City Loop in 2008. Makau won the 2009 Ras Al Khaimah Half Marathon setting the second best ever half marathon time 58:52. The world record at the time, 58:33, was held by Samuel Wanjiru. He made his marathon debut at the 2009 Rotterdam Marathon, finishing fourth and setting a fast time (2:06:14 hours), short of the fastest marathon debut, set by Evans Rutto at the 2003 Chicago Marathon (2:05:50 hours).

Makau returned to the Hague for the City-Pier-City Loop in 2010 and won for a second time, clocking another sub-one hour time of 59:52. After this he significantly improved his marathon best to 2:04:48 to win the Rotterdam Marathon, becoming the fourth fastest runner over the history of the distance. He opted to stay away from the circuit and focus himself entirely on preparations for the Berlin Marathon. A rematch with Rotterdam runner-up Geoffrey Mutai saw the two take the same positions again. Rain dampened the prospect of a record but Makau out-sprinted Mutai at the finish to clock 2:05:08 and win his first World Marathon Major. In recognition of his performances that year, he was selected as the AIMS World Athlete of the Year in a poll of race organisers.

Makau ran in the 2011 London Marathon and, in spite of a fall at the halfway point, he continued and was narrowly beaten into third at the line by Martin Lel, finishing with a time of 2:05:45.

World record

At the Berlin Marathon on 25 September 2011, Makau was set to duel against Haile Gebrselassie, the world record holder from Ethiopia. The Kenyan dropped his more experienced rival after the halfway point and went on to finish in a world record time of 2:03:38 (an average pace of 4:42.9 per mile), beating the existing record by 21 seconds. Prior to the race, he stated that he wanted to bring the marathon world record back to Kenya, following on from a former record holder Paul Tergat. Speaking after the race, Makau said "In the morning my body was not good but after I started the race, it started reacting very well. I started thinking about the record" and "At 32 km I thought I could win the race and even break the world record. It was hard [over] the last 10 kilometres".
His world record performance remained for 2 years before falling to fellow Kenyan, Wilson Kipsang Kiprotich, at the 2013 Berlin Marathon, when the record was lowered another 15 seconds to the time of 2:03:23.

2012 season
He was the pre-race favourite for the Granollers Half Marathon in February, but lost in a sprint finish to Carles Castillejo under cold weather conditions. He ran at the 2012 London Marathon but dropped out mid-race due to injury and was not selected for the Olympic team. He entered the Great Manchester Run in May and came fifth in a time of 28:21 minutes.
In the Frankfurt Marathon in October, despite feeling uncomfortable and running most of the time at the back of the leading group, Makau managed to take back the lead from Deressa Chimsa and holding on for the victory, with a time of 2:06:08.

2013 season
Makau raced in the 2013 London Marathon.  He showed to be in poor form, having been outside the lead pack already by the first time point at 5 km, falling farther and farther behind with every time point until 40 km.  By halfway, he was nearly 3 minutes behind the leaders, but he slowed further and eventually finished the race in 2:14:10, outside the top 10, more than 8 minutes back from the winner, and more than 10 minutes back from his own world record.

Road race wins

10K
London 10K – 2006
Lahore 10K – 2007
Vidovdan Road Race Brcko BH 10K – 2007
Half marathon & 25K
Zanzibar Half Marathon – 2005
Tarsus International Half Marathon – 2006
Bristol Half Marathon – 2006
BIG 25 Berlin – 2006, 2007
Berlin Half Marathon – 2007, 2008
Ras Al Khaimah Half Marathon – 2008, 2009
Reading Half Marathon – 2008
City-Pier-City Loop – 2008, 2010
Rotterdam Half Marathon – 2008

Marathons
Rotterdam Marathon – 2010
Berlin Marathon – 2010, 2011
Frankfurt Marathon – 2012
Fukuoka Marathon – 2014, 2015

Achievements
All results regarding marathon and half marathon

Personal bests

All information taken from IAAF profile, including the 2011 marathon record

References

External links

1985 births
Living people
Kenyan male long-distance runners
Kenyan male marathon runners
Berlin Marathon male winners
Frankfurt Marathon male winners
Recipients of the Association of International Marathons and Distance Races Best Marathon Runner Award
People from Nyeri County